The 1972 North Dakota gubernatorial election was held on November 7, 1972. Democratic nominee Arthur A. Link defeated Republican nominee Richard F. Larsen with 51.04% of the vote.

Primary elections
Primary elections were held on September 5, 1972.

Democratic primary

Candidates
Arthur A. Link, U.S. Representative
Edward P. Burns

Results

Republican primary

Candidates
Richard F. Larsen, incumbent Lieutenant Governor
Robert P. McCarney

Results

General election

Candidates
Arthur A. Link, Democratic
Richard F. Larsen, Republican

Results

References

1972
North Dakota
Gubernatorial